Trent is an unincorporated community in Merced County, California.

References

Unincorporated communities in California
Unincorporated communities in Merced County, California